Sorita may refer to:

 A feminine given name of African origin
 An alternative name for Barbaroux grapes
 The name for Zorita del Maestrazgo in Valencian